Arsan Makarin Al Haq (born 8 February 2001) is an Indonesian professional footballer who plays as an winger for Liga 1 club Persib Bandung.

Club career

Persib Bandung
He was signed for Persib Bandung and played in Liga 1 in 2022–2023 season
. Arsan made his league debut on 24 July 2022 in a match against Bhayangkara at the Wibawa Mukti Stadium, Cikarang.

Career statistics

Club

Notes

References

External links
 Arsan Makarin at Soccerway
 Arsan Makarin at Liga Indonesia

2001 births
Living people
People from Sumedang
Sportspeople from West Java
Indonesian footballers
Liga 1 (Indonesia) players
Bandung United F.C. players
Persib Bandung players
Association football midfielders